Bliżyn  is a village in Skarżysko County, Świętokrzyskie Voivodeship, in south-central Poland. It is the seat of the gmina (administrative district) called Gmina Bliżyn. The village has a population of 2,000.

The village was first mentioned in 1410, when King Władysław II Jagiełło spent a night there on his way to the battle of Grunwald. In 19th century Stanisław Staszic founded several minor manufactories and factories there, as part of his plan of creation of the "Old Polish Industrial Area". During World War II the forests around Bliżyn were a mass murder site of Polish intelligentsia during the so-called AB Action. After the war the forests were made into the Suchedniów-Oblęgorek Landscape Park. There are also two forest nature reserves: Świnia Góra and Dalejów located south of Bliżyn in Puszcza Świetokrzyska (Holy Cross Forest). There are also ruins of the 19th-century factories, a notable church and numerous remnants of dinosaurs in the rocky areas around the village.

References

Villages in Skarżysko County
Radom Governorate
Kielce Voivodeship (1919–1939)